The 1986 Washington State Cougars football team was an American football team that represented Washington State University in the Pacific-10 Conference (Pac-10) during the 1986 NCAA Division I-A football season. In their ninth and final season under head coach  the Cougars compiled a  record  in Pac-10, eighth place) and were outscored 312 to 221.

The Cougars tied eventual Rose Bowl champion Arizona State in Tempe in late  then beat USC by twenty points in Pullman, but lost their final five games and dropped in the standings.

WSU's statistical leaders in 1986 included senior quarterback Ed Blount with 1,882 passing yards, Kerry Porter with 921 rushing yards, and Kitrick Taylor with 523 receiving yards. Notable underclassmen included quarterback Timm Rosenbach, guard Mike Utley, and future head coach 

Schedule

Roster

Season summary

UNLV

Washington

NFL Draft
Four Cougars were selected in the 1987 NFL Draft.

References

Washington State
Washington State Cougars football seasons
Washington State Cougars football